Tan Chong Tee (15 October 1916 – 24 November 2012) was a Chinese resistance fighter based in Singapore and Malaya during World War II. An accomplished badminton player before the war, he joined Force 136 around 1942 after Singapore fell to the Japanese. In 1944, while on a mission, Tan, along with Lim Bo Seng and other Force 136 members, was captured by the Japanese. He was subjected to torture during his captivity. After the war, he returned to playing badminton and later became a businessman.

Early life
Tan was born in an ethnic Chinese family with ancestry from Fujian Province at his family residence along Shrewsbury Road in present-day Novena, Singapore. His father, Tan Kah Tek, worked in a carriage shop on Orchard Road while his mother, Lim Peng Tuan, owned a floral nursery. Tan left Singapore to further his studies in China in 1930 and returned home in 1933. He helped his mother run Kheng Cheng School, which she established in 1927.

As a badminton player
Tan was a badminton player in his youth and was also a contemporary of Wong Peng Soon. He was one of the few players to have defeated Wong in competitions.

Tan represented the Mayflower and Marigold Badminton Parties at various tournaments in Singapore. In 1935, while representing the Marigold Badminton Party at the Singapore Grade A Senior Tournament, he defeated the reigning champion and rose to prominence in the local badminton circuit. He subsequently emerged champion in various tournaments from 1936 to 1940, winning the Malaysia Open singles title in 1938, the Singapore Open singles and men's double titles in (1936,1937,1940) and (1936,1937). He married Lee Shao Meng, also a Marigold player, with whom he teamed up for various mixed doubles events and won the mixed doubles title in the 1940 Singapore Badminton Championships.

Career in Force 136
When the Second Sino-Japanese War broke out in 1937, Tan participated in anti-Japanese activities such as boycotting Japanese goods and fund-raising to support the war effort in China.

Tan lost touch with his family in 1942 after the Japanese invaded and occupied Singapore. He then joined Force 136, a branch of the Allied Special Operations Executive, where he met and befriended Lim Bo Seng. Tan participated in Operation Gustavus but was captured in 1944 by the Japanese when the operation failed. He spent the next 18 months in captivity, during which he was tortured by the Japanese, who attempted to force him to reveal the identities of other Force 136 members. He was released after the Japanese surrender in 1945. The Japanese killed Tan's elder brother, Tan Chong Mao, and their mother in the Sook Ching massacre.

Postwar life

After the war, Tan participated in badminton tournaments again and eventually became a businessman. He retired in 1985. In 1994, he wrote a Chinese-language memoir, FORCE 136: Story Of A WWII Resistance Fighter, which recounts his experiences with Force 136. The memoir was translated into English a year later by Lee Watt Sim and Clara Show, and published in 2001 by Asiapac Books as a comic book.

On 19 September 1995, Tan and eight other surviving members of Force 136 were each presented with a commemorative silver ingot to honour them for their resistance efforts.

In 2001, Tan was also part of a group selected to recite the National Pledge during the National Day Parade.

In 2002, Tan published another book named Upholding The Legacy: Singapore Badminton, which covers the history of badminton in Singapore.

Death
Tan died in Singapore on 24 November 2012 at the age of 96.

References

1916 births
2012 deaths
People from British Singapore
Singaporean people of Hokkien descent
Singaporean people of World War II
Singaporean male badminton players